The Walter Regulus was a Czechoslovakian five-cylinder, air-cooled radial engine for powering light aircraft that first ran in 1934. The engine produced 186 kW (250 hp).

Engines on display
A preserved example of the Walter Regulus engine is on display at the following museum:
Prague Aviation Museum, Kbely

Specifications (Regulus)

See also

References

1930s aircraft piston engines
Regulus
Aircraft air-cooled radial piston engines